Smith v. Board of School Commissioners of Mobile County, 827 F.2d 684 (11th Cir. 1987), was a lawsuit in which the United States Court of Appeals for the Eleventh Circuit held that the Mobile County Public School System could use textbooks which purportedly promoted "secular humanism", characterized by the complainants as a religion.

Parents and other citizens brought a lawsuit against the school board, alleging that the school system was teaching the tenets of secular humanism, an anti-theistic religion.  The complainants asked that forty-four different elementary through high school level textbooks be removed from the curriculum. After an initial ruling in a federal district court in favor of the plaintiffs, the U.S. Court of Appeals for the Eleventh Circuit ruled that as long as the school was motivated by a secular purpose, it didn't matter whether the curriculum and texts shared ideas held by one or more religious groups. The Court found that the texts in question promoted important secular values (tolerance, self-respect, logical decision making) and thus the use of the textbooks neither unconstitutionally advanced a nontheistic religion nor inhibited theistic religions.

This case is occasionally and incorrectly cited as proving that 'secular humanism' is a religion. The text below shows the Circuit Court, in overturning the District Court decision, made no such finding. They both set aside the question as moot and offered that even if it were (and they weren't saying it is), the teaching of science is not invalidated purely because of its association with secular humanism. Excerpt below from the Circuit Court decision (cited earlier):

Background
According to Dreilinger, the 1980s were an era where the religious right brought home economics into the culture wars. Earlier in the eighties, the Heritage Foundation published a pamphlet attacking the American Home Economics Association for a broad definition of the word "family" and for encouraging children to make their own choices. In 1986, an Alabama federal court heard a class-action suit which challenged the materials in forty-four textbooks. Five of the textbooks, which were based on the subject of home economics, were deemed the worst by a prosecutor. The case brought national attention from the start, with The National Legal Foundation funding the prosecution and in response, the ACLU and the People for the American Way funding a defense team to work with the state school board's attorney. At the time, Pat Robertson was seeking the Republican presidential nomination and was also the founder of The National Legal Foundation. The judge hearing the case, W. Brevard Hand, was described as a hero for the religious right. The plaintiffs charged that the books established a religion of secular humanism which gave no reason to believe in God. They attacked the home economics topic of values clarification - a favorite topic of home economics leader, Satenig St. Marie - for venturing too far away from what the plaintiffs viewed as home economics topics like sewing and cooking. The defense focused on religious liberty claims rather than accept help from the American Home Economics Association, and gathered Christian witnesses for that purpose. Many of the academic experts on both the prosecution and defense sides of the case admitted they had not read the books, had not seen a home economics class, nor had their children taken home economics. It was in this first ruling on March 3, 1987, that Judge Hand states that secular humanism was a religion and that the textbooks unconstitutionally promoted it. The ruling also said that the textbooks had to be removed from the class rooms. A few months later, over the objection of Alabama governor Guy Hunt, the appellate court overturned the verdict.

Books in question
The textbooks in the case were divided by the plaintiffs into three categories: home economics books, history books and social studies books. These were:

Home economics
 Caring, Deciding and Growing by Helen McGinley (Ginn and Company, 1983)
 Contemporary Living by Verdene Ryder           (Goodheart-Willcox, 1981, 1985)
 Homemaking: Skills for Everyday Living by Frances Baynor Parnell (Goodheart-Willcox, 1981, 1984)
 Teen Guide by Valerie Chamberlain (McGraw Hill, 1985}
 Today's Teen by Joan Kelly (Bennett & McKnight, 1981)

History
 America Is by Frank Freidel (Charles E. Merrill, 1978)
 The American Dream by Lew Smith (Scott, Foresman, 1980)
 Exploring Our Nation's History by Sidney Schwartz (Globe, 1984)
 History of a Free People by Henry W. Bragdon (Macmillan, 1981)
 A History of Our American Republic by Glenn M. Linden (Laidlaw Brothers, 1981)
 Our American Heritage by Herbert J. Bass (Silver Burdett, 1979)
 People and Our Country by Norman K. Risjord (Holt, Rinehart & Winston, 1978)
 Rise of the American Nation by Lewis Paul Todd (Harcourt Brace Jovanovich, 1977)
 These United States by James P. Shenton (Houghton Mifflin, 1981)
                                                  
Social Studies
 Rand McNally Series (1980 editions)
You and Me    
Here We Are 
Our Land  
Where On Earth   
Across America   
World Views  
Scott Foresman Series (1979 editions)
Social Studies (Grades 1–6)      
Speck (1981 editions)
Our Family
Our Neighbors
Our Communities
Our Country Today 
Our Country's History 
Our World Today 
Laidlaw (1981 editions)
Understanding People 
Understanding Families   
Understanding Communities  
Understanding Regions of the Earth

See also 
 Wallace v. Jaffree: another case involving the Mobile schools and religion

References

External links
 

United States Court of Appeals for the Eleventh Circuit cases
Establishment Clause case law
United States education case law
1987 in United States case law
1987 in religion
1987 in education
Education in Mobile County, Alabama
Secular humanism